The men's 110 metres hurdles event at the 2006 African Championships in Athletics was held at the Stade Germain Comarmond on August 11–12.

Medalists

Results

Heats
Wind: Heat 1: -2.2 m/s, Heat 2: -3.0 m/s

Final
Wind: -2.8 m/s

References
Results 

2006 African Championships in Athletics
Sprint hurdles at the African Championships in Athletics